Alabama Crimson Tide football statistical leaders identify individual statistical leaders of the Alabama Crimson Tide football program in various offensive categories, including passing, rushing, and receptions and defensive categories, including tackles, interceptions and quarterback sacks.  Within those areas, the lists identify single-game, single-season and career leaders. The Alabama Crimson Tide football program is a college football team that represents the University of Alabama in the National Collegiate Athletic Association's (NCAA) Southeastern Conference (SEC).

These stats are updated through Alabama's game against Kansas State on December 31, 2022.

Offensive statistics

Passing records

Passing yards

Passing touchdowns

Rushing records

Rushing yards

Rushing touchdowns

Receiving records

Receptions

Receiving yards

Receiving touchdowns

Total offense (combined passing/rushing stats)

Combined yards

Touchdowns responsible for
"Touchdowns responsible for" is the NCAA's official term for combined passing and rushing touchdowns.

Defensive statistics

Interceptions

Tackles

Sacks

Kicking statistics

Field goals

Field goal percentages

Longest Field goals

See also
 Alabama Crimson Tide football yearly statistical leaders

References

General

Specific

Alabama